Ipswich Town Football Club is an English association football club based in Ipswich, Suffolk.  The club was founded in 1878 and turned professional in 1936.  Ipswich has played at all professional levels of English football and has participated in European football since the 1960s.  As of 2003, the team plays in the second tier of English football, the Championship. Since 1936, more than 400 players have represented the first-team. Mick Mills has made more appearances than any other Ipswich player; he is one of five men to have represented the club on 500 or more occasions, having played 741 times between 1966 and 1983. Ray Crawford is the club's all-time top scorer, with 203 goals in 354 matches, while Ted Phillips scored the most goals in a single season—41 in the 1956–57 season.  The most capped player in the club's history is Northern Ireland's Allan Hunter, who represented his country on 47 occasions.

The list includes all players that have played 100 or more first-class professional matches for the club. It also includes some players who have played fewer than 100 matches, if they represented their country whilst playing for the club, and players who have set a club playing record, such as goalscoring or transfer fee records. Finally, all players inducted into the Ipswich Town Hall of Fame, whose inaugural members were selected in 2007 by a ballot of former Ipswich players, are included.

List of players

Players are initially listed according to the date of their first-team debut for the club. Appearances are for first-team competitive matches only, including substitute appearances, while wartime and local cup matches (such as the Ipswich Hospital Cup) are excluded.  Players who left the club prior to 2006 are referenced by Hayes, the others are referenced by Soccerbase.

Statistics are correct as of 11 March 2023.

Club captains
Below lists the club captains of Ipswich Town since the club turned professional in 1936. The club's first professional captain was Jimmy McLuckie, who captained the club from 1936 to 1945. Mick Mills has made the highest number of appearances as Ipswich Town captain, having captained the club for 11 years between 1971 and 1982. The club's current captain is Luke Chambers, who has held the captaincy since 2014, after Carlos Edwards left the club. In July 2021, Chambers left Ipswich after making close to 400 appearances in 9 years at the club, having been club captain since 2014. Following Chambers’ departure, new signing Sam Morsy was named club captain in October 2021.

Player awards

PFA Team of the Year
The following have been included in the PFA Team of the Year whilst playing for Ipswich Town:
1974–75 First Division:  Kevin Beattie
1975–76 First Division:  Kevin Beattie
1976–77 First Division:  Kevin Beattie,  Mick Mills,  Brian Talbot
1980–81 First Division:  Russell Osman,  Frans Thijssen,  John Wark,  Paul Mariner
1991–92 Second Division:  David Linighan
1997–98 First Division:  Kieron Dyer,  Mauricio Taricco
1998–99 First Division:  Richard Wright,  Mark Venus,  Kieron Dyer
1999–2000 First Division:  Richard Wright,  Marcus Stewart
2004–05 Championship:  Kelvin Davis
2013–14 Championship:  Aaron Cresswell
2014–15 Championship:  Daryl Murphy

PFA Players' Player of the Year
The following have won the PFA Players' Player of the Year award whilst playing for Ipswich Town:
1980–81:  John Wark

PFA Young Player of the Year
The following have won the PFA Young Player of the Year award whilst playing for Ipswich Town:
1973–74:  Kevin Beattie

FWA Footballer of the Year
The following have won the FWA Footballer of the Year award whilst playing for Ipswich Town:
1980–81:  Frans Thijssen

Bravo Award
The following have won the Bravo Award whilst playing for Ipswich Town:
1980–81:  John Wark

PFA Fans' Favourite
The following player was selected as the PFA Fans' Favourite for Ipswich Town as part of the celebrations of the centenary of the Professional Footballers' Association in 2007:
 John Wark

Football League Awards

Football League Young Player of the Year
The following have won the Football League Young Player of the Year award whilst playing for Ipswich Town:
2011:  Connor Wickham

Championship Apprentice Award
The following have won the Championship Apprentice Award whilst playing for Ipswich Town:
2011:  Connor Wickham

Managerial awards

LMA Manager of the Year
The following have won the LMA Manager of the Year award whilst managing for Ipswich Town:
2000–01:  George Burley

Premier League Manager of the Season
The following have won the Premier League Manager of the Season award whilst managing for Ipswich Town:
2000–01:  George Burley

Team awards

France Football European Team of the Year
1981:  Ipswich Town

Footnotes
For a full description of positions see Football Positions
Jimmy McLuckie was Ipswich Town's first professional captain.
Billy Reed was the first Ipswich player to receive full international honours while registered for the club, playing for Wales.
Ted Phillips scored the most goals in a season for Ipswich, with 41 in the 1956–57 season.
Ray Crawford is the club's all-time goal scorer with 203 goals between 1958 and 1969.
Mick Mills is the all-time appearance record-holder.
Allan Hunter is the club's most capped player with 47 appearances for Northern Ireland.
John Wark was the PFA Player of the Year in 1981.
Matteo Sereni is the club's record transfer purchase, £4,500,000, from Italian club Empoli.
Connor Wickham is the club's record transfer sale, £8,100,000, to Sunderland.
Mick Mills is the longest serving Ipswich Town captain.

References
General

 
 
 

Specific

Players
 
Ipswich Town
Association football player non-biographical articles